Golston is a surname. Notable people with the surname include:

Allan Golston, American accountant and businessman
Chauncey Golston (born 1998), American football player
Kedric Golston (born 1983), American football player